Chaville–Vélizy is a railway station of the RER C train line located on the border between Chaville and Vélizy.

External links

 

Réseau Express Régional stations
Railway stations in Yvelines